Michael Larsen may refer to:
 Michael Larsen (footballer) (born 1969), Danish footballer who competed at the 1992 Summer Olympics
 Michael Larsen (footballer born 1983), Danish professional football defender
 Michael J. Larsen, American mathematician
 Micheal Larsen, rapper known by the stage name Eyedea

See also  
 Michael Larson (disambiguation)